USS Charleston (LCS-18) is an  of the United States Navy. She is the sixth ship to be named for Charleston, the oldest and largest city in the U.S. state of South Carolina.

Design
In 2002, the United States Navy initiated a program to develop the first of a fleet of littoral combat ships. The Navy initially ordered two trimaran hulled ships from General Dynamics, which became known as the  after the first ship of the class, . Even-numbered U.S. Navy littoral combat ships are built using the Independence-class trimaran design, while odd-numbered ships are based on a competing design, the conventional monohull . The initial order of littoral combat ships involved a total of four ships, including two of the Independence-class design. On 29 December 2010, the Navy announced that it was awarding Austal USA a contract to build ten additional Independence-class littoral combat ships.

Construction and career
Charleston was built by Austal USA in Mobile, Alabama. A ceremonial laying of the keel was held at the Austal USA shipyards in Mobile on 28 June 2016. The ship's sponsor, U.S. Representative Bradley Byrne, welded his initials into the keel of Charleston as part of the ceremony.

Charleston was commissioned on 2 March 2019 and she has been assigned to Littoral Combat Ship Squadron One at her homeport of San Diego.

On 27 April 2021, an unmanned helicopter, a MQ-8 Fire Scout, took off from the ship at about 3:40 a.m. The aircraft, which is 31.7 feet long and roughly 10 feet tall, then crashed into the side of Charleston and was not recovered after falling into the sea. Despite damage to a safety net on the ship and a strike to the hull, Charleston was able to safely operate after the crash.

References

External links
 USS Charleston launches a Rolling Airframe Missile

 

Independence-class littoral combat ships
2017 ships